Edwin Leo Thomas is a British actor who works in theatre, TV & film.  He is best known for his portrayal of Robbie Ross, alongside Rupert Everett, Colin Firth & Emily Watson in The Happy Prince.

Thomas suffers from a largely invisible form of cerebral palsy, a spectrum of conditions which result from birth trauma & have developmental consequences.

Early life 
Thomas studied French & Portuguese at Wadham College, Oxford, before studying acting at the Guildhall School of Music and Drama, where he was awarded the Laurence Olivier Bursary Main Prize,  the Mary Selway Bursary & The Michael Bryant Award.

Acting career 
Thomas worked as an actor for one year after graduating from Guildhall, appearing on screen in BBC's 'Restless' (2012), ITV's Inspector Lewis (2013), & starring as Irwin in the Crucible Theatre's production of Alan Bennett's The History Boys (2013) alongside Matthew Kelly,  directed by Michael Longhurst.

In 2013, Thomas was forced to stop acting due to ill health. He suffered complications from his disability, & spent 4 years rehabilitating his injuries with The Feldenkrais Method.  

During this time he worked in education, teaching English & French and working as a careers advisor & 6th form mentor at St Mary Magdalene Academy. He also co-developed an outreach programme for the Guildhall School, running acting workshops across schools in London. 

Returning to acting in 2018, Thomas starred in The Happy Prince, written, directed by & starring Rupert Everett. Thomas plays Oscar Wilde's friend and lover Robbie Ross, alongside Colin Firth, Colin Morgan, Emily Watson, Anna Chancellor & Tom Wilkinson. The Happy Prince had its world premiere at the 2018 Sundance Film Festival, and European premiere at Berlinale Film Festival (February 2018) and was released in the UK on 15 June 2018.  

Guy Lodge said of Thomas in Variety: "Ross’s weary, take-and-take relationship with his client, friend & sometime lover gives the film its most quietly moving thread, buoyed by Thomas’s stoic, softly sorrowful performance."  For his work, Thomas was selected as a Screen International Star of Tomorrow.

He has since starred in Victoria (ITV), Invasion (Apple TV) & Into The Night (Netflix) & The Laureate (2022).

Feldenkrais 
Alongside his acting, Thomas is a professional Feldenkrais practitioner & movement teacher, having completed his four year professional training in 2021.  He is qualified to work with professional athletes, performers, musicians, children with disability & stroke patients, and combines principles of Neuroplasticity & Sport Science to improve people's movement.

Thomas both plays & is passionate about tennis and football, & is involved in the development of pioneering new techniques for rehabilitation & recovery.

Disability 
Thomas suffers from cerebral palsy.  Injuries sustained as a result of his condition prevented him from acting from much of his twenties, but he has since returned to running, swimming, tennis, football & acting, having recovered from his injuries using The Feldenkrais Method. Thomas is an advocate for Invisible disability & is involved in the spreading of awareness of disability in both education & the entertainment industry.

Awards 

 Screen International Star of Tomorrow - Thomas was one of eight actors named 2018's Star of Tomorrow

Film

Television

References

External links

https://variety.com/2018/film/reviews/the-happy-prince-review-1202671527/

1987 births
Living people
English male film actors
English male stage actors